State Route 109 (SR 109) is a primary state highway in Middle Tennessee.  It runs from the intersection of SR 265 and Interstate 840 (I-840, exit 72) near Lebanon, north through Gallatin to the Kentucky state line and I-65 (exit 121).

SR 109 is mentioned in several country music songs including "Church on the Cumberland Road" by Shenandoah and "Goodbye Earl" by the Dixie Chicks. The first Cracker Barrel Restaurant was opened by Dan Evins at the corner of I-40 and SR 109 in Lebanon, Tennessee, in 1969.

History

SR 109 originally ended at its interchange with US Route 70 (US 70), but was extended southward to connect with I-40 in 1968 and in the early 2000s to connect with SR 265 and I-840. The highway is a four-lane divided highway from I-840/SR 265 to I-40 where it becomes a four-lane non-divided highway to US 70. It then becomes a two-lane highway until it intersects with Airport Road and South Water Avenue in Gallatin. At that point, SR 109 becomes a four-lane divided highway once again and continues as a four-lane divided highway to just south of the intersection of SR 109 and SR 76 in Portland.

A new interchange was constructed in the mid-2000s with US 70, allowing for the free flow of traffic on US 70 with traffic signals controlling the exits onto SR 109. Prior to the reconstruction, US 70 eastbound traversed a long down-sloping hill to the at-grade intersection, which was a four-way stop until the early 2000s, before being converted to one using a standard traffic signal.

A bypass of downtown Gallatin was constructed in the 1990s, allowing traffic to divert around the city proper to the West. Control of the former SR 109 through town reverted to the city. In 2010, a newly-constructed four-lane divided section of the highway opened between Gallatin and Portland to replace the original narrow, curvy two-lane portion through the Highland Rim.

A four-lane bridge over the Cumberland River replaced the old two-lane bridge that was constructed in the 1950s and demolished in 2014.

Plans are also underway for SR 109 to bypass downtown Portland and intersect with I-65. This project would extend SR 109 across US 31W to intersect with the Interstate just south of the Tennessee-Kentucky state line near Lake Springs Road in Robertson County. This project was completed on November 27, 2019.

Route description

SR 109 begins in southern Wilson County at an interchange with I-840 and SR 265 (exit 72) near Gladeville. The highway heads north as a four-lane divided highway, concurrent with SR 265, for a few hundred feet before SR 265 splits off and goes west. SR 109 then heads north to enter Lebanon and have an interchange with  I-40 (exit 232) and pass through a small business district, where it passes by the original Cracker Barrel. The highway then becomes undivided and continues north through rural areas before entering an industrial area and having an interchange with US 70/SR 24 in the Martha area before leaving Lebanon and narrowing to 2-lanes. SR 109 then passes through LaGuardo before crossing the Cumberland River into Sumner County.

SR 109 immediately enters Gallatin and widens to a four-lane undivided highway and passes through a business district before coming to an intersection with Airport Road, where it turns left onto a bypass of downtown, where it becomes a divided highway once again. SR 109 then passes several neighborhoods before having an interchange with US 31E/SR 6. It then has an interchange with SR 174/SR 386 before having an at-grade intersection with SR 25. It then has an interchange with Albert Gallatin Avenue before leaving Gallatin. SR 109 then passes through the mountains of the Highland Rim as a divided highway and then enters Portland, where it becomes an undivided four-lane highway shortly before entering downtown, where it has an intersection with SR 76. The highway passes by several homes and businesses before an intersection with SR 52 and passing through downtown. SR 109 then passes through an industrial area before narrowing to two lanes. The highway then passes through farmland before widening to a four-lane divided highway and coming to a junction with US 31W/SR 41. SR 109 comes to an end shortly thereafter at an interchange with I-65 (exit 121).

Future

SR 109 is slated to be widened to a four-lane  highway, with a middle  turn lane from Gallatin to I-40 in Lebanon, primarily for the increased level of traffic from the industrial park just off the Interstate.

A plan to construct a four-lane, partial access controlled highway bypassing the town of Portland is currently being discussed by the Tennessee Department of Transportation (TDOT).

Major intersections

References

 Wilson County Highway Map
 Sumner County Highway Map

External links

109
0109
0109